Lions and Liars is the second album released by the Christian rap artist, Sho Baraka released through Reach Records on March 30, 2010. The album sold 4,294 units in its first week.  The bonus tracks are available on all copies of the album sold in stores, and are not exclusive to the deluxe edition.

Track listing

Chart positions

References

External links
 Reach Records
 Sho Baraka's Official Myspace Page

Sho Baraka albums
2010 albums
Reach Records albums
Albums produced by DJ Official